Johannes Tideln, O.P. (died 28 Jul 1501) was a Roman Catholic prelate who served as Auxiliary Bishop of Hildesheim (1477–1501) and Auxiliary Bishop of Minden (1477–1501).

Biography
Johannes Tideln was ordained a priest in the Order of Preachers. On 7 Feb 1477, he was appointed during the papacy of Pope Sixtus IV as Auxiliary Bishop of Hildesheim, Auxiliary Bishop of Minden, and Titular Bishop of Missene. He served as Auxiliary Bishop of Hildesheim and Auxiliary Bishop of Minden until his death on 28 Jul 1501 .

References 

15th-century German Roman Catholic bishops
16th-century German Roman Catholic bishops
Bishops appointed by Pope Sixtus IV
1501 deaths
Dominican bishops